The 1977 Syracuse Orangemen football team represented Syracuse University during the 1977 NCAA Division I football season. The team was led by fourth-year head coach Frank Maloney and played their home games at Archbold Stadium in Syracuse, New York. The team finished 6–5 and was not invited to a bowl game.

Assistant coaches included Tom Coughlin, a Syracuse alum who later became head coach of the Jacksonville Jaguars and New York Giants; Jerry Angelo, future general manager of the Chicago Bears; and Nick Saban, who went on to be head coach at Michigan State, LSU and Alabama, as well as the Miami Dolphins.

Schedule

Roster

References

Syracuse
Syracuse Orange football seasons
Syracuse Orangemen football